Mis Tacones is a Chicano and queer-owned vegan taquería in Portland, Oregon.

Description 

Michael Russell of The Oregonian has described Mis Tacones as a "Chicano and queer-owned vegan taco pop-up". He wrote in 2022, "The colorful new restaurant serves nourishing tacos, tortas, French fry nachos, burritos and chimichangas made with house-made seitan instead of meat, plus delightfully rainbow-hued conchas from vegan bakery La Casa De Mamá. Mis Tacones remains focused on Portland's LGBTQ community, including by offering free meals to trans people of color." Owners were inspired to provide free food to trans people of color upon request by Gay4U Vegan Eats in Oakland, California.

According to Waz Wu of Eater Portland, Mis Tacones' tortillas are "hand-pressed to order, then filled with extra juicy al pastor, asada, and cilantro-lime-marinated house-made seitan, dressed with chipotle crema and salsas". The menu also includes empanadas and meatless asada.

History 

Mis Tacones launched as a vegan pop-up restaurant in 2016. Carlos Reynoso and Polo Abram Bañuelos began making tacos in Portland after relocating from Los Angeles. Inspired by street food in Baja California and Los Angeles, the duo made seitan tacos and other foods at private dinner, Saturday markets, and queer dance events. The operation was halted by the COVID-19 pandemic. In 2021, the business operated at the gay bar Local Lounge, which was hosting outdoor drag shows.

In January 2022, owners announced plans to open a brick and mortar restaurant on Killingsworth Street in northeast Portland's Vernon neighborhood in February. The duo had launched a GoFundMe campaign to raise the initial $50,000 needed to operate a larger operation.

Reception 
Waz Wu included Mis Tacones in Eater Portland's 2021 overview of "Where to Find Tasty Vegan Tacos in Portland", and 2023 list of 15 "essential" vegan and vegetarian eateries in the city.

See also 

 Hispanics and Latinos in Portland, Oregon
 List of Mexican restaurants
 List of vegetarian restaurants

References

External links 

 Vegan taqueria Mis Tacones opens permanent location at KPTV

2016 establishments in Oregon
LGBT culture in Portland, Oregon
Mexican restaurants in Portland, Oregon
Queer culture
Restaurants established in 2016
Vegan restaurants in Oregon
Vernon, Portland, Oregon